The angelsharks are a group of sharks in the genus Squatina of the family Squatinidae. Many species are now classified as critically endangered by the International Union for Conservation of Nature. Once common over large areas of the Northeast Atlantic from Norway, Sweden, Morocco and the Canary Islands, to the Mediterranean and Black Seas, there is now significant fishing pressure which has resulted in significant population decline.

Squatinidae are unusual in having flattened bodies and broad pectoral fins that give them a strong resemblance to rays. This genus is the only one in its family and order Squatiniformes. They occur worldwide in temperate and tropical seas. Angel sharks are sometimes called monkfish, although this name is also applied to members of the genus Lophius.

While some species occur over a wide geographic range, the majority are restricted to a smaller area. Restriction in geographic range might be as a result of the behaviour of Squatina species, which are ambush predators with a corresponding stationary bottom-dwelling habit. Thus, trans-ocean migration is extremely unlikely, even though large-scale coastal migratory patterns have been reported in species such as Squatina squatina.

Appearance and biology
The angel shark has unique features that differentiates them from other sharks.

While the anterior part of the angel shark's body is broad and flattened, the posterior part retains a muscular appearance more typical of other sharks. The eyes and spiracles are dorsal and the five gill slits are on its back. Both the pectoral and pelvic fins are large and held horizontally. There are two dorsal fins, no anal fin and unusually for sharks, the lower lobe of the caudal fin is longer than the upper lobe. Most types grow to a length of 1.5 m (5 ft), with the Japanese angel shark, known to reach 2 m. Some angel sharks have deformities that have been described in elasmobranchs. These can include skeletal deformities, as lateral spinal curvature (scoliosis), humpback curvature (khyphosis), axial spinal curvature (lordosis), missing fins, additional fins, deformed snout, and more. These abnormalities have only been found in a few sharks, but the causes of these deformities have been found to be from dietary nutritional imbalance, genetic factors, parasites, traumatic injuries, or stress in the specimen. In 2015, two sharks were captured and examined, and both showed a lateral spinal curvature (scoliosis) and also a humpback curvature. Both the animals had the curvature in the middle of their pectoral fins, but the deformity did not affect their swimming capacity.

Spinal scoliosis has been reported to be diverse in sharks, but mostly in pelagic sharks that depend on their swimming abilities to catch their prey. For the angel shark, specifically S. squatina, these curvatures do not seem to significantly affect its hunting capacity, which involves burying itself to ambush their prey. Right now, research is assuming most physical injuries are caused by human interactions because of the constant interference in coastal areas, where most of the sharks reside. There have been few attacks reported, and what few have occurred were due to accidental stepping on of buried newborn sharks. Landings of Pacific angel shark increased through the mid-1980s and reached over 1,125 tonnes in 1986, becoming the shark species with the highest total reported landings off the US West coast that year.

Angel sharks possess extensible jaws that can rapidly snap upwards to capture prey and have long, needle-like teeth. They bury themselves in loose sediment lying in wait for prey, which includes fish, crustaceans and various types of mollusks. They are ovoviviparous, producing litters of up to 13 pups. Pacific angel shark pups are born from March to June in deep water; generally 180 to 300 feet (55 and 90 metres); possibly to protect the pups from predators.

Members of the family Squatinidae have a unique camouflage method, which relates to how they obtain their food, involving lying still on the sea floor, making rapid lunges at passing prey, and using negative pressure to capture prey by sucking it into their mouths.

Species analysis
Morphological identification in the field can be difficult due to discontinuity and similarity of species. In this specific circumstance, the sharks' place within the genus Squatina comprises three species in the southern part of the western Atlantic. The three species observed were Squatina guggenheim, S. occulta and the Brazilian guitarfish Pseudobatos horkelii. These three species are listed in the IUCN Red List as threatened, and they are  now protected under Brazilian law, which makes angling and exchange illegal. To prevent landing and trade of these endangered species along the São Paulo, DNA barcoding was used. DNA barcoding revealed fishing and trafficking of these protected species.

Habitat
Angel sharks inhabit temperate and tropical marine environments. They are known to bury themselves in sandy or muddy environments during the day, where they remain camouflaged for weeks until a desirable prey crosses paths with them. At night, they take a more active approach and cruise on the bottom of the floor. Squatina preys on fish, crustaceans, and cephalopods.

Behaviour
Although this shark is a bottom-dweller and appears harmless, it can inflict painful lacerations if provoked, due to its powerful jaws and sharp teeth. It may bite if a diver approaches the head or grabs the tail.

Angelsharks have a unique way of breathing compared to most other benthic fish. They do not pump out water from the oropharyngeal cavity like other fish. Instead they use gill flaps located under their body to pump out water during respiration. Doing so also allows them to be more discreet and prevent detection.

Commercial value
Prior to the late 1980s, the Pacific angel shark was considered a "munk fish". It was a byproduct of commercial gillnetting, with no commercial appeal and was used only for crab bait. In 1977, Michael Wagner, a fish processor in Santa Barbara, California, US, in cooperation with local commercial fishermen, developed the market for angel sharks. The annual take of angel shark in 1977 was an estimated 147 kg. By 1985, the annual take of angel shark on the central California coast had increased to more than 454 tonnes or an estimated 90,000 sharks. The population declined dramatically and is now regulated. Angel sharks live very close to shore, resulting in high bycatch rates. In 1991, the use of gillnets in nearshore state waters of California was forbidden, and fishing was restricted in a larger portion of the Pacific angel shark's range.

In April 2008, the UK government afforded the angel shark full protection under the Wildlife and Countryside Act. Once considered abundant in the Atlantic Ocean, the angel shark (Squatina squatina) was classified as "critically endangered" in 2010.

Species
Currently, the 26 recognized species in this genus are:
 Squatina aculeata G. Cuvier, 1829 (sawback angelshark)
 Squatina africana Regan, 1908 (African angelshark)
 Squatina albipunctata Last & W. T. White, 2008 (eastern angelshark)
 Squatina argentina (Marini, 1930) (Argentine angelshark)
 Squatina armata (Philippi {Krumweide}, 1887) (Chilean angelshark)
 Squatina australis Regan, 1906 (Australian angelshark)
 Squatina caillieti J. H. Walsh, Ebert & Compagno, 2011 (Philippines angelshark)
 Squatina californica Ayres, 1859 (Pacific angelshark)
 Squatina david Acero P, Tavera Vargas, Anguila-Gómez & Hernández-Beracasa, 2016 (David's angelshark)
 Squatina dumeril Lesueur, 1818 (sand devil)
 Squatina formosa S. C. Shen & W. H. Ting, 1972 (Taiwan angelshark)
 Squatina guggenheim Marini, 1936 (angular angelshark)
 Squatina heteroptera Castro-Aguirre, Espinoza-Pérez & Huidobro-Campos, 2007 (disparate angelshark)
 Squatina japonica Bleeker, 1858 (Japanese angelshark)
 Squatina legnota Last & W. T. White, 2008 (Indonesian angelshark)
 Squatina mapama Long, Ebert, Tavera, Pizarro, and Robertson, 2021 (Small-crested angelshark)
 Squatina mexicana Castro-Aguirre, Espinoza-Pérez & Huidobro-Campos, 2007 (Mexican angelshark)
 Squatina nebulosa Regan, 1906 (clouded angelshark)
 Squatina occulta Vooren & K. G. da Silva, 1991 (hidden angelshark)
 Squatina oculata Bonaparte, 1840 (smoothback angelshark)
 Squatina pseudocellata Last & W. T. White, 2008 (western angelshark)
 Squatina punctata Marini 1936
 Squatina squatina (Linnaeus, 1758) (angelshark)
 Squatina tergocellata McCulloch, 1914 (ornate angelshark)
 Squatina tergocellatoides J. S. T. F. Chen, 1963 (ocellated angelshark)
 Squatina varii Vaz & Carvalho, 2018 (Brazilian angelshark)

See also
 List of sharks
 List of prehistoric cartilaginous fish

References

 
Ovoviviparous fish
Oxfordian first appearances
Extant Late Jurassic first appearances
Taxa named by André Marie Constant Duméril